Terrapin Crossroads was a music venue,, bar, and restaurant active from 2011 until 2021 in San Rafael, California, founded by former Grateful Dead bassist Phil Lesh.

Concept
On March 29, 2011, Phil Lesh posted a statement on the Furthur.net site community message board that he was planning to open a new live music venue in Marin County, north of San Francisco, in the near future. Said Lesh, "We're taking the first steps to make a long time dream - a permanent musical home - come true. We are purchasing a building in Marin, and plan on remodeling it to feel like an old barn; we're calling it Terrapin Landing. We will continue with Furthur while making music at Terrapin Landing when we are at home. The music will be varied, featuring: Phil Lesh & Friends (continuing the tradition of revolving lineups, including old as well as new friends); West Coast Rambles, based on (and blessed by) Levon Helm's historic Rambles; Album night - we pick a favorite album or two to play live; Telstar night - we put together a band for free form improvisation; Sing-alongs to monthly Sunday morning gospel music; Trivia nights; Monthly big band night; Seminars with local musicians and artists; Our goal is to create a vibrant community gathering place: beautiful, comfortable, welcoming - for members of the community to commingle and enjoy good music".

Fairfax proposal
In April 2011, Lesh disclosed more details about "Terrapin Landing", originally planned as a remodel of The Good Earth natural food store in Fairfax, California, which would then be used to host a variety of musical fare. However, in July, 2011, this initial plan was changed from utilizing The Good Earth property to the construction of a brand new structure in the adjacent lot formerly occupied by a gas station and car repair shop. On August 1 (Jerry Garcia's birthday), formal plans for what is now being called "Terrapin Crossroads" were submitted to the Fairfax Town Council for approval. The building was designed as a three floor, 16500 square foot structure (8250 square foot footprint), that would accommodate about 500 people, and which would host between 50 and 100 performances per year. If approved, construction would begin in the summer of 2012 and would be completed in the summer of 2013.

The project was not without controversy, however, particularly among the local residents of Fairfax, who were concerned about the potential traffic, noise, trash, loitering, vagrancy, crime, and drugs that the venue might bring to the small, quiet town of about 7300 people (as of 2011). A Fairfax town council meeting whose agenda was to include a discussion about the venue, including a proposal for a traffic study, was scheduled for Wednesday, August 17, 2011. However, the Leshes pulled the topic from the agenda after someone anonymously posted signs reading, "No Terrapin, Please", along Phil's normal morning walking route in his home town of Ross a day or two earlier. The Fairfax Chamber of Commerce hosted a Town Hall meeting on the Terrapin Crossroads project on September 1. Town Manager Michael Rock, Planning Director Jim Moore and Bruce Burman of Jazz Builders, the project manager for the proposed Phil Lesh-backed music venue, made presentations and answered questions. Given the ongoing controversy about siting the venue in Fairfax, the Leshes decided to ponder the situation during the month of September, and announce their ultimate decision sometime in October.

On November 8, Bruce Burman released a statement from the Leshes: "After careful consideration we have decided not to move forward with Terrapin Crossroads in Fairfax. For all of you that have supported our efforts and helped to define the vision, we are extremely grateful. Phil looks forward to making music and creating a community gathering place sooner rather than later."

San Rafael location

On January 2, 2012 Lesh announced that Terrapin Crossroads would open at the former location of the Seafood Peddler restaurant in San Rafael. Furthur did some rehearsal shows a couple years prior in their Palm Ballroom. 

On February 14, 2012, Phil Lesh and Friends performed a live webcast of a one-set performance at the new Terrapin Crossroads location.  The venue had a "soft opening" on March 8, 2012.  The first official concerts at Terrapin Crossroads were a run of 12 shows by Phil Lesh and Friends, from March 17 to April 1, 2012.

In addition to the music hall, dubbed "The Grate Room", Terrapin Crossroads consisted of a large bar (site of many free bar shows), a lounge, and large dining room on the first floor. The second story consisted of another large lounge/VIP area. Terrapin also had outdoor seating and dining outside alongside the canal and docks for those who boated to the restaurant/venue. Terrapin Crossroads was designed by Hulburd Design of San Francisco. 

The restaurant portion of the venue was temporarily closed due to the COVID-19 pandemic. In November 2021, Lesh announced that Terrapin Crossroads had closed permanently.

References

External links
 Official Terrapin Crossroads Website

Grateful Dead
Music venues in the San Francisco Bay Area
Buildings and structures in San Rafael, California
2012 establishments in California
Companies disestablished due to the COVID-19 pandemic